The 2013 Sheikh Jassim Cup was the 35th edition of the league cup competition for football teams from Qatar.

Al Rayyan were the defending champions.

Groups 
18 clubs from the Qatar Stars League and Qatari 2nd Division were drawn into 4 groups. The winners of each group qualify for the semi-finals.

All group games are played in one 'host' location, instead of the common home and away format used in other competitions.

Group stage

Group A

Group B

Group C

Group D

Semi finals

Final

References

2013
2013–14 in Qatari football
2013 domestic association football cups